Qillwaqucha (Quechua qillwa, qiwlla, qiwiña gull, qucha lake, "gull lake", also spelled Quiuluacocha) is a mountain in the Andes of Peru which reaches a height of approximately . It is located in the Huánuco Region, Huánuco Province, on the border of the districts of Cayrán and Chaulán. It lies southwest of Munti Wasi and a mountain named Yawarqucha ("blood lake").

References 

Mountains of Peru
Mountains of Huánuco Region